The 2010 British 125 Championship season was the 23rd British 125cc Championship season, the class is open to anyone of any age and sex. James Lodge stayed in the class after winning the championship last season, and was looking to be the first person to successfully defend the British 125cc Championship. With a number of riders leaving to move up to other classes such as superstock 600, new challengers emerged to challenge for the title. With the two stroke classes disappearing from the world scene in 2012, the future of the 125 championship in Britain is looking doubtful.

As well as the main championship there was a separate class called the ACU Academy Cup, for 13- to 16-year-old riders, with an end of season prize of paid entries to the final two rounds of the CEV Championship (Spanish 125 Championship) at Valencia and Jerez. A number of the riders from the British 125 Championship also contested the Red Bull MotoGP Rookie Cup, a championship for 125cc motorcycles that takes place alongside specific rounds of Grand Prix motorcycle racing. In 2010, Danny Kent, Harry Stafford and Taylor Mackenzie all raced in the championship finishing second, seventh and 15th respectively.

Lodge eventually retained his title but only after coming out of a final round, three-way title battle with Rob Guiver and Deane Brown. Lodge won the championship by four points, taking four victories over the course of the season, with Guiver finishing second ahead of Brown on countback; two victories to Brown's one. Taylor Mackenzie (3), John McPhee and Ross Walker were the other riders to win races over the season. Brown won the secondary Academy Cup with six victories.

Calendar
The British 125 Championship was a support series for the main British Superbike Championship, and thus it followed the same calendar structure with one race per meeting held on the Sunday. 

Notes:
1. – The Knockhill race was cancelled due to bad weather conditions.
2. – As a result, there was a double header of 125 action at Croft with Race one taking place on Saturday 11 September and race 2 taking place on the Sunday. The grid positions from Knockhill were carried forward for the first race. Riders who did not take part at Knockhill were not eligible to enter the first race at Croft.
3. – The first race at Croft was stopped after three laps and restarted, before the restart was stopped after three laps due to a circuit curfew. The race result was declared, with half points awarded as per series regulations.

Championship standings

Riders' Standings

ACU Academy Cup Standings

References

External links
 The official website of the British Superbike Championship

125